Astragalus murinus is a species of milkvetch in the family Fabaceae.

References

murinus
Taxa named by Pierre Edmond Boissier